Smyrna Town Hall-Opera House is a historic town hall and theater at the hamlet of Smyrna in Chenango County, New York. It was built in 1907 and is a modest two story rectangular building under a shallow hipped roof topped by a square wooden cupola.  It is of wood-frame construction with a yellow brick veneer, three bays wide and four bays deep.

It was added to the National Register of Historic Places in 2008.

References

Theatres on the National Register of Historic Places in New York (state)
Government buildings completed in 1907
Buildings and structures in Chenango County, New York
National Register of Historic Places in Chenango County, New York
Opera houses in New York (state)
City and town halls on the National Register of Historic Places in New York (state)
Opera houses on the National Register of Historic Places in New York (state)